Richard Parker (14 September 1894 – 1 January 1969) was an English professional footballer who made over 200 appearances as a centre forward in the Football League. He is best remembered for his three-year spell with Millwall, for whom he scored 62 goals in 88 league matches.

Personal life 
Parked attended Tilery School in Stockton-on-Tees. He served in the Northumberland Fusiliers during the First World War.

Career statistics

References

External links 
Sunderland AFC profile

1894 births
1969 deaths
Footballers from Stockton-on-Tees
Footballers from County Durham
English footballers
Association football forwards
South Bank F.C. players
Stockton F.C. players
Sunderland A.F.C. players
Coventry City F.C. players
South Shields F.C. (1889) players
Queens Park Rangers F.C. players
Millwall F.C. players
Watford F.C. players
Military personnel from County Durham
Merthyr Town F.C. players
Tunbridge Wells F.C. players
English Football League players
Northern Football League players
Southern Football League players
Royal Northumberland Fusiliers soldiers
British Army personnel of World War I